Fylgia amazonica is a monotypic species of dragonfly in the family Libellulidae. It is a deep forest species, breeding in stagnant pools. It occurs in Latin America from Venezuela to northern Brazil.

References

Sources

Libellulidae
Taxa named by William Forsell Kirby
Insects described in 1889